Pays-d'en-Haut may refer to:
 Pays d'en Haut, territory of New France (1610–1763)
 Les Pays-d'en-Haut Regional County Municipality, regional county municipality in Québec, Canada

Pays-d'Enhaut may refer to:
 Riviera-Pays-d'Enhaut District, district of the Canton of Vaud, Switzerland
 Pays-d'Enhaut District, former district of the Canton of Vaud

See also 
 Highland (disambiguation)
 Pays (France)